New Beginning is the second studio album by American R&B female trio SWV. It was released by RCA Records on April 23, 1996 in the United States. The lead single, "You're the One", became one of their signature songs peaking at number five on the US Billboard Hot 100 and topped the Hot R&B Singles. The second single, "Use Your Heart", saw the debut of the super producers The Neptunes. This song peaked at twenty-two on the Hot 100 and number six on the R&B chart. The last single, "It's All About U", found Taj taking most of the lead as opposed to Coko. New Beginning was certified platinum by the Recording Industry Association of America (RIAA).

Critical reception

AllMusic senior editor Stephen Thomas Erlewine found that "the group does take a different approach on New Beginning, backing away from the New Jack grooves that dominated their debut and exploring a more direct, organic R&B vibe. They haven't left hip-hop behind, but they've added a new array of sonic textures that gives their music added depth. But the true strength of New Beginning is the vocal capabilities of SWV [...] There may be a couple of weak spots on the album, but the trio's considerable talents make those moments easy to forgive."

Track listing

Notes
  signifies a co-producer

Charts

Weekly charts

Year-end charts

Certifications

References

External links
 

1996 albums
SWV albums
Albums produced by the Neptunes
Albums produced by Erick Sermon
RCA Records albums